Góra Świętego Jana ("St. John's Mountain") is a village in the administrative district of Gmina Jodłownik, which is within Limanowa County, Lesser Poland Voivodeship, in southern Poland.

The closest airport to the village is the Nowy Targ Airport.

The village has a population of approx 370.

References

Villages in Limanowa County